Dominik Kaiser (born 16 September 1988) is a German professional footballer who plays as a midfielder.

Career

Early career
Born in Mutlangen, West Germany, Kaiser was raised in Waldstetten and played for various clubs, such as TGSV Waldstetten, Normannia Gmünd and VfL Kirchheim/Teck before re–joining Normannia Gmünd in 2007. Up until he was 17, Kaiser played tennis before decided to quit to fully concentrate on football. At the time of quitting tennis, he was considered one of the best of the national association.

Kaiser made his Normannia Gmünd debut, coming on as a second–half substitute, in a 3–0 loss against Alemannia Aachen in the first round of the DFB–Pokal. Since making for his debut for Normannia Gmünd, Kaiser became a first team regular for the side in the Oberliga Baden-Württemberg.

1899 Hoffenheim
In 2009, Kaiser moved to 1899 Hoffenheim II, which was largely credited to his brother, who knew Markus Gisdol at SC Geislingen. Shortly after, he was assigned to the U23 side and then the second team.

At TSG 1899 Hoffenheim II, Kaiser made his debut for the side, where he played 17 minutes after coming on as a second–half substitute, in a 1–0 loss against TSG Weinheim. He then scored his first goal for TSG 1899 Hoffenheim II, in a 6–3 win over FC Denzlingen on 2 September 2009. He went on to finish his first season at TSG 1899 Hoffenheim II, making 32 appearances and scoring five times in all competitions.

At the start of the 2010–11 season, Kaiser was promoted to the first team, where he trained regularly with the squad. He then appeared in the first team as an unused substitute in number of matches, whilst appearing in TSG 1899 Hoffenheim II during the 2010–11 season. Kaiser waited for a long time until on 14 May 2011 when he made his debut at TSG 1899 Hoffenheim, coming on as a second–half substitute for Edson Braafheid, in a 3–1 loss against VfL Wolfsburg.

At some to his TSG 1899 Hoffenheim time there, he signed his first professional contract. At the start of the 2011–12 season, Kaiser was given a handful of first team appearances. His first appearance of the 2011–12 came on 13 August 2011, where he came on as a second–half substitute, in a 1–0 win over Borussia Dortmund. This lasted until late–October when he was replaced by the returning Fabian Johnson and appeared on the substitute bench, as well as, the club's second team for the rest of the season. Despite his first team opportunities limited, Kaiser extended his contract with the club, keeping him until 2014, on 3 January 2012. Later in the 2011–12 season, he made two more appearances. At the end of the season, he went on to make a 10 appearances in all competitions. Shortly after the end of the season, Kaiser was expected to leave ahead of the 2012–13 season following a new management of Markus Babbel.

RB Leipzig

Kaiser left TSG 1899 Hoffenheim for RB Leipzig, a club based on Regionalliga Nordost, on 11 July 2012, signing a contract until 2016. The move saw Kaiser reunited with Manager Ralf Rangnick, who he known at TSG 1899 Hoffenheim.

Kaiser made his RB Leipzig debut in the opening game of the season, starting the whole game, in a 1–1 draw against Union Berlin II. He then scored his first goal for the club on 23 September 2012, in a 3–0 win over Germania Halberstadt. Since making his debut for the club, Kaiser quickly established himself in the starting eleven for the side, playing in the defensive midfield under Alexander Zorniger. He started every match in the league since the start of the season until he suffered an ankle injury during a 1–1 match against Carl Zeiss Jena on 3 December 2012. He, again, injured his ankle in early–March. Despite the injuries, Kaiser then helped the side win the Regionalliga Nordost and won promotion to the 3. Liga, after three seasons in the Regionalliga after beating Sportfreunde Lotte. He later went on to score three goals in 26 appearances in all competitions at the end of the 2012–13 season.

In the 2013–14 season, Kaiser started the season well when he scored on Matchday 3, in a 2–1 win over Wacker Burghausen. Kaiser started every match since the start of the season and scored four more goals before missing one game, due to suspension. After returning from suspension, Kaiser then scored again on 21 December 2013, in a 2–1 win over Hallescher FC. In a follow up match against Wacker Burghausen on 25 January 2014, he captained RB Leipzig for the first time in his career, which saw RB Leipzig lose 1–0. It came after when he was appointed as the vice–captain in early–January 2014. He later captained RB Leipzig again for the second time this season, which came against SV Elversberg on 2 March 2014 and scored, as well as, assisting another goal, in a 2–0 win. Then, on 3 May 2014, Kaiser scored a hat–trick, as well as, setting up two goals, in a 5–1 win over 1. FC Saarbrücken, a win that help the club reach promotion to 2. Bundesliga after finishing the season in second place and became the first team since the introduction of the 3. Liga to win promotion to the 2. Bundesliga after only one season. Initially playing out as a defensive midfielder position, Kaiser then switched into playing as an attacking midfielder position. For his performance, Kaiser was named 3. Liga Player of the Year.

In the 2014–15 season, Kaiser was featured for the first two league matches to the season before suffering a thigh injury. After returning to the first team from injury, he then scored his first goal of the season, as well as, setting up two goals, in a 3–1 win over Karlsruher SC on 24 September 2014. In the next match against Fortuna Düsseldorf, Kaiser captained the side for the first time this season, in a 2–2 draw. Following this, he continued to regain his first team place for the rest of the season. A month later against Erzgebirge Aue in the second–round of DFB–Pokal, he played a vital role during the match when he scored, as well as, setting up two goals, in a 3–1 win. Later in the 2014–15 season, Kaiser captained the side in a number of matches in the absence of Daniel Frahn. Despite missing two matches later in the 2014–15 season,

Ahead of the 2015–16 season, Kaiser was given a captaincy following the departure of Daniel Frahn to 1. FC Heidenheim. He started out playing in the central–midfielder at the start of the 2015–16 season following a tactics change. Kaiser then set up a goal for Davie Selke, who scored a header, in a 2–0 win over Eintracht Braunschweig on 15 August 2015. On 4 October 2015, he scored his first goal of the season, in a 3–2 win over 1. FC Nürnberg. His performance resulted in him signing a three–year contract, keeping him until 2018, later that month. His goal against FSV Frankfurt on 13 December 2015 earned him December's Goal of the Month. Under his leadership at RB Leipzig, Kaiser helped the club gain promotion to the Bundesliga after beating Karlsruher SC 2–0 on 8 May 2016. Despite missing four matches in the 2015–16 season,

In the 2016–17 season, Kaiser remained captain for the side following a new management of Ralph Hasenhüttl. He then scored his first goal of the season, but was the only one who missed the penalty in the shoot–out, which saw Leipzig eliminated by Dynamo Dresden in the first round of DFB–Pokal. Kaiser played his first Bundesliga match since 2012 against his former club, TSG 1899 Hoffenheim and scored in a 2–2 draw in the opening game of the season. He was the first RB Leipzig to score in the Bundesliga. Kaiser started the season at the first team place, but soon lost his first team and was demoted to the substitute bench. Despite this, Kaiser remained involved in the first team for the side towards the end of the season. At the end of the 2016–17 season, Kaiser went on to make a total of 26 appearances and scoring twice in all competitions.

Ahead of the 2017–18 season, Kaiser's captaincy status was in doubt after Manager Hasenhüttl made a decision to give a captain role to either Diego Demme and Willi Orban. Eventually, the role went to Orban. His first appearance of 2017–18 season came on 27 August 2017, coming on as a second–half substitute, in a 4–1 win over SC Freiburg. He also made his UEFA Champions League debut, where he played 16 minutes after coming on as a second–half substitute, in a 2–1 loss against Beşiktaş on 6 December 2017. However, he continued to struggle in the first team and playing time, due to strong competitions. Kaiser, himself, said he wanted to stay at the club until the end of the season.

On 13 May 2018, Kaiser was awarded a testimonial match by RB Leipzig, in honour of him being their longest-serving player after spending six years with the club.

Brøndby
On 1 July 2018, Kaiser signed with Danish Superliga club Brøndby on a two-year contract, reuniting with former Leipzig coach, Alexander Zorniger. In his first season at Brøndby, he reached the Danish Cup final in which he scored. The final was, however, lost to Midtjylland on penalties.

On 8 August 2019, Kaiser scored two goals as Brøndby lost 4–2 in the first leg of the UEFA Europa League qualification match against Portuguese club Braga. The first goal was a sensational shot off a clearance from a Brøndby corner.

At the start of the 2019–20 season he was selected as Brøndby 'Player of the Month' four times in a row. In October 2019, with Kaiser's contract set to expire in the summer, the club expressed an interest in a contract extension.

Hannover 96
On 18 January 2020, Kaiser signed with 2. Bundesliga club Hannover 96, after failing to reach an agreement over a contract extension with Brøndby. He made his debut on 28 January in a 1–0 away loss to SSV Jahn Regensburg, coming on as a substitute for Marc Stendera in the 59th minute. He managed 16 appearances during his first six months at the club, as Hannover ended in 6th place in the league table, well out of competition for promotion.

Before the 2020–21 season, Kaiser was appointed the new team captain of Hannover 96 by head coach Kenan Koçak, succeeding Marvin Bakalorz in that role, as the latter had left for Denizlispor. On 14 September 2020, Kaiser scored his first goal for the club in a 3–2 away win over Würzburger Kickers in the DFB-Pokal after an assist by Marvin Ducksch. His first league goal followed shortly after, on 19 September, in a 2–0 win home at Niedersachsenstadion over Karlsruher SC, again after an assist by Ducksch.

Personal life
Kaiser has an older brother, Steffen, who works as a doctor in Esslingen. Growing up, Kaiser supported Bayern Munich. He said he goes to church.

Outside of football, Kaiser also practices Judo.

References

1988 births
Living people
People from Mutlangen
Sportspeople from Stuttgart (region)
German footballers
Footballers from Baden-Württemberg
1. FC Normannia Gmünd players
VfL Kirchheim/Teck players
TSG 1899 Hoffenheim II players
TSG 1899 Hoffenheim players
RB Leipzig players
Brøndby IF players
Hannover 96 players
Bundesliga players
2. Bundesliga players
3. Liga players
Danish Superliga players
Association football midfielders
German expatriate footballers
German expatriate sportspeople in Denmark
Expatriate men's footballers in Denmark